The Allied military phonetic spelling alphabets prescribed the words that are used to represent each letter of the alphabet, when spelling other words out loud, letter-by-letter, and how the spelling words should be pronounced for use by the Allies of World War II. They are not a "phonetic alphabet" in the sense in which that term is used in phonetics, i.e. they are not a system for transcribing speech sounds.

The Allied militaries – primarily the US and the UK – had their own radiotelephone spelling alphabets which had origins back to World War I and had evolved separately in the different services in the two countries. For communication between the different countries and different services specific alphabets were mandated.

The last WWII spelling alphabet continued to be used through the Korean War, being replaced in 1956 as a result of both countries adopting the ICAO/ITU Radiotelephony Spelling Alphabet, with the NATO members calling their usage the "NATO Phonetic Alphabet".

During WWII, the Allies had defined terminology to describe the scope of communications procedures among different services and nations. A summary of the terms used was published in a post-WWII NATO memo:

 combined—between services of one nation and those of another nation, but not necessarily within or between the services of the individual nations
 joint—between (but not necessarily within) two or more services of one nation
 intra—within a service (but not between services) of one nation
Thus, the Combined Communications Board (CCB), created in 1941, derived a spelling alphabet that was mandated for use when any US military branch was communicating with any British military branch; when operating without any British forces, the Joint Army/Navy spelling alphabet was mandated for use whenever the US Army and US Navy were communicating in joint operations; if the US Army was operating on its own, it would use its own spelling alphabet, in which some of the letters were identical to the other spelling alphabets and some completely different.

WWII CCB (ICAO) and NATO alphabets

The US and UK began to coordinate calling alphabets by the military during World War II and by 1943 they had settled on a streamline communications that became known as the CCB. Both nations had previous independently developed alphabet naming system dating back to World War I. Subsequently, this second world war era letter naming became accepted as standard by the ICAO in 1947.

After the creation of NATO in 1949, modifications began to take place. An alternative name for the ICAO spelling alphabet, "NATO phonetic alphabet", exists because it appears in Allied Tactical Publication ATP-1, Volume II: Allied Maritime Signal and Maneuvering Book used by all navies of NATO, which adopted a modified form of the International Code of Signals. Because the latter allows messages to be spelled via flags or Morse code, it naturally named the code words used to spell out messages by voice its "phonetic alphabet". The name NATO phonetic alphabet became widespread because the signals used to facilitate the naval communications and tactics of NATO have become global. However, ATP-1 is marked NATO Confidential (or the lower NATO Restricted) so it is not available publicly. Nevertheless, a NATO unclassified version of the document is provided to foreign, even hostile, militaries, even though they are not allowed to make it available publicly. The spelling alphabet is now also defined in other unclassified international military documents. The NATO alphabet appeared in some United States Air Force Europe publications during the Cold War. A particular example was the Ramstein Air Base Telephone Directory, published between 1969 and 1973 (currently out of print). The US and NATO versions had differences, and the translation was provided as a convenience. Differences included Alfa, Bravo and Able, Baker for the first two letters.

The NATO phonetic spelling alphabet was first adopted on January 1, 1956, while the ICAO radiotelephony spelling alphabet was still undergoing final changes.

United Kingdom military spelling alphabets

British Army radiotelephony spelling alphabet

Royal Navy radiotelephony spelling alphabet

RAF radiotelephony spelling alphabet 
The RAF radiotelephony spelling alphabet, sometimes referred to as the "RAF Phonetic Alphabet", was used by the British Royal Air Force (RAF) to aid communication after the take-up of radio, especially to spell out aircraft identification letters, e.g. "H for Harry", "G for George", etc. Several alphabets were used, before being superseded by the adoption of the NATO/ICAO radiotelephony alphabet.

History
During World War I battle lines were often static and forces were commonly linked by wired telephone networks. Signals were weak on long wire runs and field telephone systems often used a single wire with earth return, which made them subject to inadvertent and deliberate interference. Spelling alphabets were introduced for wire telephony as well as on the newer radio voice equipment.

The British Army and the Royal Navy had developed their own quite separate spelling alphabets. The Navy system was a full alphabet, starting: Apples, Butter, Charlie, Duff, Edward, but the RAF alphabet was based on that of the "signalese" of the army signallers. This was not a full alphabet, but differentiated only the letters most frequently misunderstood: Ack (originally "Ak"), Beer (or Bar), C, D, E, F, G, H, I, J, K, L, eMma, N, O, Pip, Q, R, eSses, Toc, U, Vic, W, X, Y, Z.

By 1921, the RAF "Telephony Spelling Alphabet" had been adopted by all three armed services, and was then made mandatory for UK civil aviation, as announced in Notice to Airmen Number 107.

In 1956, the NATO phonetic alphabet was adopted due to the RAF's wide commitments with NATO and worldwide sharing of civil aviation facilities.

 The choice of Nuts following Monkey is probably from "monkey nuts" (peanuts); likewise Orange and Pip can be similarly paired, as in "orange pip".
 "Vic" subsequently entered the English language as the standard "Vee"-shaped flight pattern of three aircraft.

United States military spelling alphabets

US Army radiotelephony spelling alphabet 

 'Interrogatory' was used in place of 'Inter' in joint Army/Navy Operations.

US Navy radiotelephony spelling alphabet 
The US Navy's first phonetic spelling alphabet was not used for radio, but was instead used on the deck of ships "in calling out flags to be hoisted in a signal". There were two alternative alphabets used, which were almost completely different to one another, with only the code word "Xray" in common.

The US Navy's first radiotelephony phonetic spelling alphabet was published in 1913, in the Naval Radio Service's Handbook of Regulations developed by Captain William H. G. Bullard. The Handbook's procedures were described in the November 1917 edition of Popular Science Monthly.

Joint Army/Navy radiotelephony spelling alphabet 
The Joint Army/Navy (JAN) spelling alphabet was developed by the Joint Board on November 13, 1940, and it took effect on March 1, 1941. It was reformulated by the CCB following the entrance of the US into World War II by the CCB "Methods and Procedures" committee, and was used by all branches of the United States Armed Forces until the promulgation of its replacement, the ICAO spelling alphabet (Alfa, Bravo, etc.), in 1956. Before the JAN phonetic alphabet, each branch of the armed forces had used its own radio alphabet, leading to difficulties in interbranch communication.

The US Army used this alphabet in modified form, along with the British Army and Canadian Army from 1943 onward, with "Sugar" replacing "Sail".

The JAN spelling alphabet was used to name Atlantic basin storms during hurricane season from 1947 to 1952, before being replaced with a new system of using female names.

Vestiges of the JAN spelling system remain in use in the US Navy, in the form of Material Conditions of Readiness, used in damage control.  Dog, William, X-Ray, Yoke, and Zebra all reference designations of fittings, hatches, or doors.  The response "Roger" for "· – ·" or "R", to mean "received", also derives from this alphabet.

The names Able to Fox were also widely used in the early days of hexadecimal digital encoding of text, for speaking the hexadecimal digits A to F (equivalent to decimal 10 to 15), although the written form was simply the capital letters A to F.

See also
 Allied Communication Procedures
 International Code of Signals
 Spelling alphabet
 APCO radiotelephony spelling alphabet
 Cockney alphabet
 German phonetic alphabet
 Greek spelling alphabet
 ICAO radiotelephony spelling alphabet
 Toc H—example of signalese carry-over

References

External links
 Signal Flags and the Phonetic Alphabet—NavSource Naval History
 Visual Signaling, Signal Corps, United States Army, 1910—a book at the Internet Archive

1941 in military history
History of the United States Army
Military communications of the United Kingdom
Military communications
Phonetic Alphabet, RAF
Spelling alphabets
Telecommunications-related introductions in 1941
United States Navy

de:Buchstabiertafel#Joint Army/Navy Phonetic Alphabet (Able, Baker, …)